Masindi District is a district in Western Uganda. Like many other Ugandan districts, it is named after its 'chief town' of Masindi, the location of the district headquarters.

Location
Masindi District is bordered by Nwoya District to the north, Kiryandongo District to the east, Nakasongola District and Nakaseke District to the southeast, Kyankwanzi District to the south, Hoima District to the southwest and Bulisa District to the northwest. The coordinates of the district are: 01 41N, 31 44E.

Overview
Approximately  (2.1%) of the district are permanent wetlands.

Population
The region of the country in which the district is located is comparatively dry, but is fertile enough to support a predominantly agriculturalist population. Most of the district residents are both poor and rural. The district, as configured currently, had population of about 129,700 during the 1991 national population census. Eleven years later, during the national census of 2002, the population had increased to about 208,420. At that time, 50.1% of the population were males and 49.9% were females. The annual population growth rate in the district at that time was 5.1%. During 2012, the mid-year population of the district was estimated at approximately 352,400.

Masindi District has a diverse ethnic composition of 55 tribes, with the dominant tribes, the Banyoro and the Bagungu, forming about 59.9% of the population. The Alur, the Jonam and the Aringa form 5.3%. The Baruli form 4.5%. People from Rwanda, Kenya, South Sudan and the Democratic Republic of the Congo have also settled permanently in the district. The average household size is about 4.86 persons, lower than the regional average of 5.2. The population is predominantly rural, with only 5.43% of the residents living in urban areas.

Economic activities
Agriculture is the main economic activity in the district. Crops grown include:

Fishing is practiced in the rivers and on Lake Albert. Fish farming is an important economic activity with over 250 ponds in the district. Bee keeping for honey production is an increasing practice in the district. Tourism is also increasing with a steady stream of visitors to Murchison Falls National Park.

73.1% of the population in the district are engaged in smallholder agricultural activities. About 6.2% of the total farmland is under large scale commercial farming. The district is the leading producer of maize in the region. In Uganda, only Iganga District and Kapchorwa District produce more maize than Masindi District.

Points of interest
The following points of interest are found in Masindi District:

 Murchison Falls National Park - More than 50% of the park is located in Masindi District, south of the Victoria Nile
 Murchison Falls - On the Victoria Nile, are also located in Masindi District, inside the national park.
 * Budongo Forest Reserve - About , by road, west of Masindi on the Masindi-Butiaba Road
 Omukama's Palace - One of the palaces of the Omukama of Bunyoro

See also
 Masindi
 Bunyoro Kingdom
 Bunyoro sub-region
 Murchison Falls National Park
 Murchison Falls

References

 
Bunyoro sub-region
Districts of Uganda
Western Region, Uganda
Lake Albert (Africa)